Lachnocrepis is a genus of beetles in the family Carabidae, containing the following species:

 Lachnocrepis japonica Bates, 1873
 Lachnocrepis parallela (Say, 1830)
 Lachnocrepis prolixa Bates, 1873

References

Licininae